The Gap may refer to:

Places

Australia
 The Gap, New South Wales, a locality near Wagga Wagga, New South Wales
 The Gap, Northern Territory, a suburb of Alice Springs, Northern Territory
 The Gap, Queensland, a suburb of Brisbane, Queensland
 The Gap, South Australia, a locality near Naracoorte, South Australia
 The Gap (Sydney), an ocean cliff at Watsons Bay, Sydney, New South Wales
 The Gap is a feature in Torndirrup National Park in Western Australia

Canada
 Rural Municipality of The Gap No. 39, Saskatchewan

United States
 Fort Indiantown Gap, a US Army fort located in Lebanon County, Pennsylvania

Arts
 The Gap Band, an American music group
 The Gap (Joan of Arc album), a 2000 album by Joan of Arc
 The Gap (Bryn Haworth album), a 1980 studio album by Bryn Haworth
 The Gap (song), a 1982 song by The Thompson Twins
 The Gap (film) (El Boquete), a 2006 Argentine film
 Der Spalt  (The Gap), a 2014 German film

Other
 The Gap (book), discussing the cognitive difference between humans and other animals
 The Gap, Inc., chain of retail clothing stores
 The Gap (magazine), Austrian culture and music magazine
 The Gap FC, an Australian soccer team
 nickname for Volunteer Speedway in Greene County, Tennessee

See also
 The Gap, in the science fiction novel series The Gap Cycle by Stephen Donaldson
 Gap (disambiguation)
 Gaap